Garcinia celebica is an accepted name of a tree species in the family Clusiaceae.  The Catalogue of Life lists no subspecies.

Description and vernacular names
A number of descriptions of this (evidently variable) plant, notably in Indo-China by Pierre and others, relate to records under synonyms such as Garcinia benthamii and G. ferrea; the latter has been called rỏi mật (sometimes gỏi) in Vietnamese.  The species name indicates an original description in the Celebes (Sulawesi) and it is found throughout Malesia, with local names (especially Borneo) including: Kalawet, Kandis, Kandis pulan, Manggis, Manggis hutan, Perda-perda and Sungkep.

Based on the above, the species is a tropical forest main canopy tree some 25–30 m high in Vietnam, or up to 36 m tall and 0.93 m dbh in Indonesia; trunks and stems can exude white to yellow latex.  The leaves are approximately 130 x 60 mm.  
Flowers are yellowish, approximately 12 mm.  
Fruits are ovoid up to 45 mm: with  5-10 segments.

References

External links 
 
 

celebica
Trees of Vietnam
Flora of Malesia
Flora of Indo-China
Plants described in 1754
Taxa named by Carl Linnaeus
Taxobox binomials not recognized by IUCN